The following highways are numbered 231:

Canada
 Manitoba Provincial Road 231
 Newfoundland and Labrador Route 231
 Prince Edward Island Route 231
 Quebec Route 231

Costa Rica
 National Route 231

India
 National Highway 231 (India)

Japan
 Japan National Route 231

United States
 U.S. Route 231
 Arkansas Highway 231
 California State Route 231 (former)
 Colorado State Highway 231
 Florida State Road 231 
 Georgia State Route 231
 K-231 (Kansas highway)
 Kentucky Route 231 (former)
 Maine State Route 231
 Maryland Route 231
 M-231 (Michigan highway)
 Minnesota State Highway 231 (former)
 Missouri Route 231
 Montana Secondary Highway 231
 Nevada State Route 231
 New Mexico State Road 231 
 New York State Route 231
 North Carolina Highway 231
 Ohio State Route 231
 Oregon Route 231 (former)
 Pennsylvania Route 231 
 South Dakota Highway 231 
 Tennessee State Route 231  
 Texas State Highway 231
 Texas State Highway Loop 231
 Texas State Highway Spur 231
 Utah State Route 231
 Virginia State Route 231 
 Wyoming Highway 231